Carpaine is one of the major alkaloid components of papaya leaves which has been studied for its cardiovascular effects. Circulatory effects of carpaine were studied in Wistar male rats weighing 314 +/- 13 g, under pentobarbital (30 mg/kg) anesthesia. Increasing dosages of carpaine from 0.5 mg/kg to 2.0 mg/kg resulted in progressive decrease in systolic, diastolic, and mean arterial blood pressure. Selective autonomic nervous blockade with atropine sulfate (1 mg/kg) or propranolol hydrochloride (8 mg/kg) did not alter the circulatory response to carpaine. Carpaine, 2 mg/kg, reduced cardiac output, stroke volume, stroke work, and cardiac power, but the calculated total peripheral resistance remained unchanged. It is concluded from these results that carpaine affects the myocardium directly. The effects of carpaine may be related to its macrocyclic dilactone structure, a possible cation chelating structure.

References 

Lactones
Piperidine alkaloids
Macrocycles